The current state of quantum computing is referred to as the noisy intermediate-scale quantum (NISQ) era, characterized by quantum processors containing 50-100 qubits which are not yet advanced enough for fault-tolerance or large enough to achieve quantum supremacy. These processors, which are sensitive to their environment (noisy) and prone to quantum decoherence, are not yet capable of continuous quantum error correction. This intermediate-scale is defined by the quantum volume, which is based on the moderate number of qubits and gate fidelity. The term NISQ was coined by John Preskill in 2018.

Algorithms 
NISQ algorithms are designed for quantum processors in the NISQ era, such as the variational quantum eigensolver (VQE) and quantum approximate optimization algorithm (QAOA), which use NISQ devices but offload some calculations to classical processors. These algorithms have been successful in quantum chemistry and have potential applications in various fields including physics, material science, data science, cryptography, biology, and finance. However, they often require error mitigation techniques to produce accurate results.

Beyond-NISQ era 
The creation of a computer with tens of thousands of qubits and enough error correction would eventually end the NISQ era. These beyond NISQ devices would be able to, for example, implement Shor's algorithm for very large numbers and break RSA encryption.

See also 
 Quantum supremacy

References

External links 
 John Preskill lecture on NISQ era

Computer architecture statements
History of computing hardware
Quantum computing
Quantum information science
Computational complexity theory